Francisco Javier Mendieta Jiménez (born 28 November 1955 in San Luis Potosí) is a Mexican telecommunications engineer and academic who chaired the Ensenada Center for Scientific Research and Higher Education (Cicese) and serves, by presidential appointment, as the founding director-general of the Mexican Space Agency.

Mendieta graduated with a bachelor's degree in Mechanical and Electrical Engineering from the National Autonomous University of Mexico (UNAM) and earned both a master's degree and a doctorate in Telecommunications at the École Nationale Supérieure des Télécommunications (also known as Télécom ParisTech) in Paris, France.

He has conducted experiments for the National Aeronautics and Space Administration (NASA) of the United States and, for the STS-61-B Atlantis mission, he was designated as an eventual substitute of Rodolfo Neri Vela, the reserve payload specialist who became the first Mexican national in space.

Notes and references

Living people
1955 births
People from San Luis Potosí
Mexican telecommunications engineers
National Autonomous University of Mexico alumni
Télécom Paris alumni